Dragon boat was an Asian Games sport in 2010 and 2018 editions.

Editions

Events

Medal table

Participating nations

List of medalists

External links
 Ocasia

 
Sports at the Asian Games
Asian Games